The Bornean leafbird (Chloropsis kinabaluensis), also known as the Kinabalu leafbird, is a species of bird in the family Chloropseidae. It is found in humid forest in Borneo, to which it is endemic (elevated areas, including the Meratus Mountains). It has traditionally been considered a subspecies of the blue-winged leafbird (C. cochinchinensis), but differ in measurements and morphology, the female Borneon leafbird having a distinctive male-like plumage. The distribution of the two are known to approach each other, but there is no evidence of intergradation.

References

 Wells, D. R. (2005). Chloropsis kinabaluensis (Bornean Leafbird). pp. 264–265 in: del Hoyo, J., A. Elliott, & D. A. Christie. eds. (2005). Handbook of the Birds of the World. Vol. 10. Cuckoo-shrikes to Thrushes. Lynx Edicions, Barcelona.

Chloropsis
Birds of East Malaysia
Endemic birds of Borneo
Birds described in 1887
Taxonomy articles created by Polbot
Fauna of the Borneo montane rain forests